Ruben Jacobus Kruger (30 March 1970 – 27 January 2010) was a South African rugby union player. He played as a flanker. He had two daughters Zoë (b. 2002) and Isabella (b. 2005), whose play tennis. Isabella played quarter final on the junior tournament at the 2022 Wimbledon Championships.

Playing career

Provincial
A product of Grey College in Bloemfontein, Kruger played for the  schools team at the annual Craven Week tournament in 1987 and 1988 and gained selection for the South African Schools team in both years. After representing the Free State under-20 team in 1989 and 1990, he made his senior provincial debut for the Free State in 1991. In 1995 Ruben Kruger was named South African Rugby Football Union's player of the year.

International
Kruger played for the South Africa national rugby union team between 1993 and 1999. He played his first test match for the Springboks on 6 November 1993 against Argentina at the  Ferro Carril Oeste Stadium in Buenos Aires.

In 1995, he played in the Rugby World Cup. During this tournament, he made 5 starts, and scored 1 try, in the controversial semi-final against the France national rugby union team. Kruger also played in the 1999 World Cup and in addition to his 36 test matches, he also played in 20 tour matches and scored 14 tries.

Test history 
 World Cup Final

World Cups
1995 : world champions, 5 selections (Wallabies, Romania, Samoa, France, All Blacks).
1999 : 2 selections (Spain, All Blacks).

Later career
At the end of his rugby career, he became a camera salesman. He owned a Minolta franchise in Pretoria. He was portrayed in Invictus, a film about Nelson Mandela and the 1995 Springboks, by Grant Roberts.

Death
Kruger died in Pretoria on 27 January 2010 after battling brain cancer for 10 years. He was two months short of his 40th birthday.

See also
List of South Africa national rugby union players – Springbok no. 596
List of South Africa national under-18 rugby union team players
List of South Africa national rugby sevens players

References

External links
Site springboks 1996
scrum.com statistics

1970 births
2010 deaths
Deaths from cancer in South Africa
Deaths from brain tumor
Rugby union flankers
South Africa international rugby union players
South African rugby union players
Bulls (rugby union) players
Blue Bulls players
South Africa international rugby sevens players
Free State Cheetahs players
Alumni of Grey College, Bloemfontein
Rugby union players from the Free State (province)